Francis C. Whelan (December 11, 1907 – August 22, 1991) was a United States district judge of the United States District Court for the Central District of California and the United States District Court for the Southern District of California.

Education and career

Born in O'Neill, Nebraska, Whelan received a Bachelor of Arts degree from San Diego State University in 1928 and both a Bachelor of Laws and a Juris Doctor from the UC Berkeley School of Law in 1932. He was in private practice in San Diego, California from 1932 to 1935. He was an Assistant United States Attorney of the Southern District of California from 1935 to 1939. He was special assistant to the United States Attorney General of the United States Department of Justice from 1939 to 1948. He was in private practice in Los Angeles, California from 1948 to 1961. He was the United States Attorney for the Southern District of California from 1961 to 1964.

Federal judicial service

Whelan was nominated by President Lyndon B. Johnson on August 17, 1964, to a seat on the United States District Court for the Southern District of California vacated by Judge Leon Rene Yankwich. He was confirmed by the United States Senate on September 15, 1964, and received his commission the same day. He was reassigned by operation of law to the United States District Court for the Central District of California, to a new seat established by 80 Stat. 75 on September 18, 1966. He assumed senior status on January 7, 1978. Whelan served in that capacity until his death on August 22, 1991, in Palm Desert, California.

References

Sources
 

1907 births
1991 deaths
Judges of the United States District Court for the Southern District of California
Judges of the United States District Court for the Central District of California
United States district court judges appointed by Lyndon B. Johnson
20th-century American judges
20th-century American lawyers
UC Berkeley School of Law alumni
San Diego State University alumni
People from O'Neill, Nebraska
Assistant United States Attorneys